Bryan Stork (born November 15, 1990) is a former American football center. He was drafted by the New England Patriots in the fourth round of the 2014 NFL Draft. He played college football at Florida State.

In the span of 13 months, Stork was the starting center for Florida State's win in the 2014 BCS National Championship Game as a senior, and the starting center as a rookie for the Patriots when they won Super Bowl XLIX. His NFL career lasted only two years after a series of concussions and a failed trade.

High school career 
A native of Vero Beach, Florida, Stork attended Vero Beach High School, where he was teammates with Zeke Motta. Stork played tight end in high school, but was primarily a blocker in a run-based offense and registered 43 pancake blocks. In his senior year, Vero Beach finished 9–3 and lost in the second round of the playoffs to Royal Palm Beach.

Regarded as a three-star recruit by Rivals.com, Stork was listed as the No. 26 tight end prospect in his class. He chose the Seminoles over offers from Maryland, Syracuse, Central Florida, and Florida International.

College career 
After redshirting his initial year at Florida State, Stork was converted into an interior offensive lineman. He began the 2010 season as a reserve, but then had to replace sophomore David Spurlock at right guard midway through the Boston College game, after Spurlock suffered a concussion. Stork made his first career start the following week at North Carolina State, but then missed the next two games with illness. Having lost his starting job, he returned to the field on the road at Maryland, replacing Henry Orelus at right guard in the second quarter. Stork started the last three games of the season and graded out at 77 percent in the 2010 ACC Championship Game against Virginia Tech. He followed that performance up by grading out at 80 percent with a 92 pass grade in the 2010 Chick-fil-A Bowl against South Carolina.

Stork won the Rimington Trophy in 2013 given to the nation's most outstanding center .

As a senior in 2013, Stork was a first-team All-Atlantic Coast Conference (ACC) selection.

Stork is a member of the Florida State chapter of Phi Delta Theta fraternity.

Professional career

2014 NFL Draft 

Stork was selected by the New England Patriots in the fourth round of the 2014 NFL Draft.

New England Patriots
Stork signed his rookie contract on May 19, 2014.

As a rookie, Stork started 11 regular season games for the Patriots, as well as the team's two playoff games; he missed the AFC Championship Game with an knee injury. On February 1, 2015, the Patriots won Super Bowl XLIX over the Seattle Seahawks. Stork became the fifth player ever to win a college national title and a Super Bowl in back to back years.

Stork was placed on short-term injured reserve to start the 2015 season due to a concussion and a neck injury. He was activated on November 7, 2015, and the next day played guard and right tackle against the Washington Redskins due to a spate of injuries on the Patriots' offensive line.

On August 24, 2016, Stork was traded to the Washington Redskins in exchange for a conditional 7th round pick in 2017. On August 29, before the trade was finalized, Stork failed his physical examination with the Redskins, which voided the trade. Stork was released by the Patriots later that day.

On March 21, 2017, Stork announced his retirement from the NFL after not playing in 2016 after suffering multiple concussions during his two seasons in the league.

Coaching career
Stork was an Offensive Graduate Assistant at Southern Miss Golden Eagles football for the 2017 and 2018 seasons. Since 2019 Stork has been the Tight Ends Coach at East Tennessee State University. After the 2021 SoCon Championship season concluded at ETSU, in early March 2022, Bryan Stork was hired as the Offensive Line Coach at University of the Cumberlands in Williamsburg, Kentucky.

References

https://cumberlandspatriots.com/news/2022/3/9/football-super-bowl-champion-stork-joins-patriots-staff.aspx

External links 
Florida State Seminoles bio
New England Partiots bio

1990 births
Living people
People from Vero Beach, Florida
Players of American football from Florida
American football centers
American football offensive guards
Florida State Seminoles football players
New England Patriots players
All-American college football players
Vero Beach High School alumni